La Quiete is an Italian screamo band formed in 2000 in Forlì. They are part of the 21st century European screamo movement alongside bands such as Raein, who they share members with, and Daitro.

Members
Current
Cebio – guitar
Michele – drums
Angelino – bass
Andrea – guitar
Fulvio – vocals

Past
Fobbeo – bass
Congorock – guitar
Boris – vocals

Discography
Studio albums
La fine non è la fine (2004; Gasping for Breath/React with Protest/Heroine/Utarid Tapes/Sons of Vesta)

EPs
La Quiete (2006; Pure Pain Sugar)
La Quiete (2008; Sons of Vesta)

Splits
With Acrimonie (2002; Life of Hate)
With the Apoplexy Twist Orchestra (2003; Heroine)
With Catena Collapse (2003; Heroine/Adagio830)
With KC Milian (2004; Cragstan Astronaut)
With the Pine (2004; Broken Hearts Club)
With Louise Cyphre (2005; Electric Human Project)
With Phoenix Bodies (2008; Holiday/Level Plane)

Compilations
Tenpeun 2001–2005 (2006; Perpetual Motion Machine/Sons of Vesta)
2006–2009 (2009; Sons of Vesta)

Compilation appearances
The Microwave Says to the Pacemaker (2003; Slave Union)
Wayfarer's All (2004; Owsla)
This Is Your Life (2005; Ape Must Not Kill Ape)
Emo Armageddon (2005; React with Protest)
Memento Mori (2006; Sons of Vesta)

References

External links
Official website (archived)
La Quiete on Myspace

Screamo musical groups
Italian punk rock groups
Italian hardcore punk groups
Italian alternative rock groups
People from Forlì
2000 establishments in Italy
Musical groups established in 2000
Musical quintets